is a former Japanese football player. From 2004 to 2008, he was the president of Japanese football club JEF United Ichihara Chiba.

References

1951 births
Living people
Japanese footballers
Japanese football chairmen and investors
Japan Soccer League players
Association football goalkeepers